Korian "Korie" Lucious (born  November 5, 1989) is an American former professional basketball player. He played college basketball for the Iowa State University Cyclones men's basketball team. Upon transferring from the Michigan State University Spartans men's basketball team in 2011, he redshirted the 2011–12 season and began playing for the Cyclones in 2012–13.

Early life
On March 30, 2004, the 14-year-old Lucious was featured and described as a phenom in the sports section of the Milwaukee Journal Sentinel. After playing two years at perennial basketball powerhouse Rufus King High School, Lucious made a highly publicized transfer to the private Pius XI High School.

College career
As a sophomore during the 2009–2010 season for Michigan State, Lucious saw his playing time more than double as he averaged 22.9 minutes per game, up from 9.1 as a freshman. He averaged 5.6 points, 3.3 assists, and 1.7 rebounds per game during his sophomore campaign. He hit a buzzer-beating three against the University of Maryland in the second round of 2010 NCAA Men's Division I Basketball Tournament to give the Spartans an 85-83 win over the Terrapins.   The 5th-seeded Spartans eventually made it all the way to the Final Four, falling to Butler.

In January 2011, Lucious was suspended from the Michigan State program for the remainder of the 2010–2011 season for "conduct detrimental to the team." "I didn't live up to the standards of the program," Lucious said in the statement. "Unfortunately, I let my teammates, my coaches, and myself down, and wish them the best for the rest of the season."

Lucious then transferred to Iowa State University where, due to transfer rules, he would have to sit for the 2011–2012 season. In the 2012–2013 season he would go on to start all 35 games he would play at Iowa State. The Cyclones would make the 2013 NCAA Men's Division I Basketball Tournament beating Notre Dame before falling to Ohio State.

College statistics 

|-
| style="text-align:left;"| 2008–09
| style="text-align:left;"| Michigan State
| 38 || 1 || 9.1 || .377 || .354 || .667 || .8 || 1.2 || .3 || .1 || 3.2
|-
| style="text-align:left;"| 2009–10
| style="text-align:left;"| Michigan State
| 36 || 6 || 22.9 || .341 || .317 || .739 || 1.7 || 3.3 || .8 || .1 || 5.6
|-
| style="text-align:left;"| 2010–11
| style="text-align:left;"| Michigan State
| 18 || 0 || 24.4 || .312 || .284 || .762 || 1.7 || 4.1 || .8 || .2 || 6.5
|-
| style="text-align:left;"| 2012–13
| style="text-align:left;"| Iowa State
| 35 || 35 || 31.1 || .377 || .366 || '.803 || 1.9 || 5.6 || .8 || 0 || 10.1
|-
| style="text-align:left;"| Career
| style="text-align:left;"| 
| 127 || 42 || 21.2 || .356 || .336 || .766 || 1.5 || 3.4 || .6 || .1 || 6.2

Professional career
In August 2013, Lucious announced he has signed with Polish team Rosa Radom.

On August 26, 2017, he signed with Macedonian basketball club Rabotnički.

Personal life
Lucious is the son of Latonia Guider and Antone Brazil.

References

1989 births
Living people
American expatriate basketball people in Canada
American expatriate basketball people in China
American expatriate basketball people in Cyprus
American expatriate basketball people in Poland
American expatriate basketball people in North Macedonia
Basketball players from Gary, Indiana
Iowa State Cyclones men's basketball players
Keravnos B.C. players
KK Rabotnički players
Michigan State Spartans men's basketball players
Moncton Miracles players
Point guards
Rosa Radom players
American men's basketball players
Rufus King International High School alumni